The 2015–16 season was Stevenage's second consecutive season in League Two and their 40th year in existence. Along with competing in League Two, the club also participated in the FA Cup, League Cup and Football League Trophy. The season covers the period from 1 July 2015 to 30 June 2016.

Transfers

Transfers in

Transfers out

Loans in

Competitions

Pre-season friendlies
On 29 May 2015, Stevenage announced three home pre-season friendlies against Nottingham Forest, Millwall and Tottenham Hotspur XI. On 16 June 2015, Stevenage confirmed a XI squad will face St Neots Town. Also a friendly fixture against Spanish side Sevilla B was announced.

League Two

League table

Matches
On 17 June 2015, the fixtures for the forthcoming season were announced.

August

September

October

November

December

January

February

March

April

May

FA Cup

League Cup
On 16 June 2015, the first round draw was made, Stevenage were drawn away against Ipswich Town.

Football League Trophy
On 5 September 2015, the second round draw was shown live on Soccer AM and drawn by Charlie Austin and Ed Skrein. Stevenage hosted Dagenham & Redbridge.

References

Stevenage
Stevenage F.C. seasons